The Lost Children is a French fairy tale collected by Antoinette Bon in Revue des traditions populaires.

It is Aarne-Thompson type 327A.  Another tale of this type is Hansel and Gretel; The Lost Children combines with that type several motifs typical of Hop o' My Thumb, which is typical of French variants.

Synopsis

She hid them, but her husband could smell them because they were Christians. He beat his wife and put Jean into the barn to fatten him up before eating him, making Jeanette bring him food.  The Devil was too fat to get into the barn, so he ordered Jeanette to bring him the tip of Jean's finger to test how fat he was; Jeanette brought him a rat's tail.

The third time, he noticed the trick and pulled Jean out. He made a sawhorse to lay Jean on to bleed, and went for a walk. Jeanette and Jean pretend not to understand how he was to be put on the sawhorse. The Devil's wife showed them, and Jean tied her on and cut her throat. They took the Devil's gold and silver and fled in his carriage. The Devil chased them.

On the way, he met various people – a laborer, a shepherd, a beadle, some laundresses – and asked whether they had seen the children. The first time he asked, they each misheard him, but then told him they hadn't, except for the laundresses, who told him they crossed the river. The Devil could not cross it, so one laundress offered to cut her hair to let him cross on it, but when he was in the middle, the laundresses dropped it, so he drowned. The children got home and took care of their parents, despite what they had done.

References

Lost Children
The Devil in fairy tales
Child characters in fairy tales
ATU 300-399